Sándor Bárdosi (born 29 April 1977) is a Hungarian former wrestler and former mixed martial artist  who competed in the 2000 Summer Olympics.

Mixed martial arts record

|-
|Win
|align=center|1–0
|Paulius Poska
|Submission (arm triangle choke)
|K1
Europe Grand Prix 2008 Final Elimination 
|
|align=center|1
|align=center|1:14
|Budapest, Hungary
|

Mixed martial arts amateur record

|-
| Win
| align=center| 1–1
| István Frank 
| TKO (punches)
| XLsport: K-3 Final
| 
| align=center| 1
| align=center| N/A
|Budapest, Hungary
| 
|-
| Loss
| align=center| 0–1
| Gusztáv Dietz
| Submission (kneebar)
| XLsport: K-3 Hungary
| 
| align=center| 1
| align=center| N/A
| Budapest, Hungary
|

References

External links
 

1977 births
Living people
Olympic wrestlers of Hungary
Wrestlers at the 2000 Summer Olympics
Hungarian male sport wrestlers
Olympic silver medalists for Hungary
Olympic medalists in wrestling
Medalists at the 2000 Summer Olympics
Competitors at the 2009 World Games
Sport wrestlers from Budapest